The Dennis Hotel (also known as the McCarthy Hotel) is a historic hotel in St. Petersburg, Florida. It is located at 326 1st Avenue North. On April 17, 1986, it was added to the U.S. National Register of Historic Places.

References

External links
 Pinellas County listings at National Register of Historic Places
 Florida's Office of Cultural and Historical Programs
 Pinellas County listings
 Kelly Hotel

National Register of Historic Places in Pinellas County, Florida
Buildings and structures in St. Petersburg, Florida